This article is about the particular significance of the year 1850 to Wales and its people.

Incumbents

Lord Lieutenant of Anglesey – Henry Paget, 1st Marquess of Anglesey 
Lord Lieutenant of Brecknockshire – John Lloyd Vaughan Watkins
Lord Lieutenant of Caernarvonshire – Peter Drummond-Burrell, 22nd Baron Willoughby de Eresby 
Lord Lieutenant of Cardiganshire – William Edward Powell
Lord Lieutenant of Carmarthenshire – George Rice, 3rd Baron Dynevor 
Lord Lieutenant of Denbighshire – Robert Myddelton Biddulph   
Lord Lieutenant of Flintshire – Sir Stephen Glynne, 9th Baronet
Lord Lieutenant of Glamorgan – Christopher Rice Mansel Talbot (from 4 May)
Lord Lieutenant of Merionethshire – Edward Lloyd-Mostyn, 2nd Baron Mostyn
Lord Lieutenant of Monmouthshire – Capel Hanbury Leigh
Lord Lieutenant of Montgomeryshire – Charles Hanbury-Tracy, 1st Baron Sudeley
Lord Lieutenant of Pembrokeshire – Sir John Owen, 1st Baronet
Lord Lieutenant of Radnorshire – John Walsh, 1st Baron Ormathwaite
Bishop of Bangor – Christopher Bethell 
Bishop of Llandaff – Alfred Ollivant 
Bishop of St Asaph – Thomas Vowler Short 
Bishop of St Davids – Connop Thirlwall

Events
18 March – Opening of the Britannia Bridge.
3 April – G. T. Clark marries Ann Price Lewis, a descendant of one of the original partners in the Dowlais Ironworks.
18 June – Opening of the South Wales Railway between Chepstow and Swansea.
October – The Merthyr Board of Health is founded, with John Josiah Guest as its first chairman.
November – The first issue of the periodical Y Drych is printed, though not in circulation for another two months
14 December – 13 men are killed in a mining accident at New Duffryn Colliery, Mountain Ash.
unknown dates
The Llanelli Board of Health is founded, with William Chambers as its first chairman.
Vaendre Hall in the village of St Mellons is completed, the home of the industrialist John Cory.

Arts and literature

New books
Thomas Edwards (Caerfallwch) – Geirlyfr Saesoneg a Chymraeg, An English and Welsh Dictionary
'Elen Egryn' (Elin Evans) – Telyn Egryn (poems)
Elijah Waring – Recollections and Anecdotes of Edward Williams
Morris Williams (Nicander) – Y Psalmwyr

Music
September – North Wales Musical Festival is held at Rhuddlan Castle.

Births
1 January – Evan Rees (Dyfed), minister, poet and archdruid (died 1923)
4 January – Griffith J. Griffith, industrialist (died 1919)
16 April – Sidney Gilchrist Thomas, inventor (died 1885)
24 November – John Aeron Thomas, politician (died 1935)
date unknown 
Alfred Davies, footballer (died 1891)
John Evan Davies, minister and author (died 1929)
Owen Owen, teacher and schools inspector (died 1920)

Deaths
11 April
David Hughes, clergyman and writer, 64?
Edward Hughes (Y Dryw), poet, 77
18 April – John Richards, Welsh-born US politician, 85
19 April – Sir John Edwards of Garth, politician, 80
11 July – Robert Williams (Robert ap Gwilym Ddu), poet and hymn-writer, 83
28 July – David Lewis, Carmarthenshire priest and writer, 90?
2 September – Charles Williams-Wynn, politician, 74
19 December – George Williams, politician, 85

References

 
Wales